For information on all San Diego State University sports, see San Diego State Aztecs
The San Diego State Aztecs women's basketball team represents San Diego State University in San Diego, California in NCAA women's basketball competition. The team currently plays in the Mountain West Conference.

Post-season results

Regular season conference championships
Western Athletic Conference (3)
 1994, 1995, 1997

Mountain West Conference (2)
 2009, 2012, 2013

Conference tournament championships
Western Athletic Conference tournament (2)
 1994, 1997
Mountain West Conference tournament (2)
 2010, 2012

NCAA tournament results

References

External links